Kenneth George Beamish (born 25 August 1947) is an English former football player, coach and manager. In his playing days he was a forward, and he scored a total of 198 goals in 642 league and cup games throughout a sixteen-year career in the Football League.

He started his career at Tranmere Rovers in 1965, and in six years at the club would make close to 200 appearances. From March 1972, he then spent three years with Brighton & Hove Albion, making around 100 appearances. In May 1974 he signed with Blackburn Rovers for £25,000, and went on to play close to 100 games with the club in a two-year spell. Bought by Port Vale for £12,000 in September 1976, he was voted the club's Player of the Year in 1977–78, and was the club's top scorer for two consecutive seasons. Sold to Bury for £35,000 in September 1978, he played around 50 games, before he moved back to Tranmere Rovers in 1979. In 1981, he transferred to Swindon Town, before he announced his retirement the following year. He later served as Swindon's manager in the 1983–84 campaign.

Playing career

Tranmere Rovers
Beamish started his career with Fourth Division Tranmere Rovers in 1966, under the management of Dave Russell. Rovers missed out on promotion at the end of 1965–66 after finishing behind fourth-place Colchester United on goal average. Promotion was achieved in 1966–67, after the club finished fourth, four points ahead of Crewe Alexandra. Tranmere retained their Third Division status in 1967–68, 1968–69, 1969–70, and 1970–71. Beamish was the club's top scorer two out of his six seasons with the club. Now managed by Jackie Wright, Rovers struggled in 1971–72.

Brighton & Hove Albion
On 9 March 1972 – transfer deadline day, Beamish switched to league rivals Brighton & Hove Albion for a fee of £25,000 plus Alan Duffy, and saw his wages doubled. The club were already performing well with the strike duo of Willie Irvine and Kit Napier, though the management felt that Beamish would offer more "bite" up front. Beamish enjoyed a successful start to his Brighton career, as he contributed six goals in twelve starts and two substitute appearances as the club won promotion as Third Division runners-up in 1971–72. Coach Ray Crawford stated that Beamish's goals helped the club to get over the line and clinch promotion. However the club struggled in the Second Division, and finished in last place in 1972–73. Playing in a strike partnership with Barry Bridges, his nine Second Division goals made him the club's joint-top scorer. Manager Pat Saward was replaced by Brian Clough, but the 1973–74 campaign was also difficult, as Brighton avoided their second successive relegation by eight points. Beamish finished as top-scorer with twelve goals but was not included on an end-of-season trip to Spain as Clough was reportedly dissatisfied with his lack of balance and poise. He said that he discovered he had been transfer-listed from his neighbour, who had heard the news on the radio.

Blackburn Rovers
Beamish was signed by Gordon Lee's Blackburn Rovers for a £25,000 fee in May 1974. He soon built a good understanding with strike partner Don Martin. The 1974–75 season was successful, as Blackburn were promoted to the Second Division as champions of the Third Division, with Beamish claiming 11 of he and Martin's 26 goal haul. Rovers finished mid-table in 1975–76 under the stewardship of Jim Smith. A popular player, fans would chant "Beamo, Beamo" years after he left Ewood Park.

Port Vale
He joined Third Division Port Vale for £12,000 in September 1976 and went straight into the first-team. He became the club's top scorer in the 1976–77 season with 18 goals in 44 games; three of these goals came against Grimsby Town at Blundell Park on 3 January. He was voted Player of the Year for his 16 goals in 49 games in the 1977–78 season; he scored ten goals more than his closest rival Jeff Hemmerman, as the club were relegated into the Fourth Division. He started the 1978–79 campaign with four goals in four consecutive games, before he was sold on to Third Division Bury for £35,000 in September 1978.

Later career
He helped the "Shakers" to avoid relegation in 1978–79, as he scored 20 goals in 49 league games for the club before he returned to Tranmere Rovers in November 1979 for a fee of £10,000; Rovers were now back in the Fourth Division and managed by John King. Rovers suffered in 1979–80 and 1980–81, and had to apply (successfully) for re-election under Bryan Hamilton in 1981. He then transferred to Swindon Town on a free transfer in May 1981, and played just two league games, as Swindon were relegated out of the Third Division in 1981–82.

Style of play
Beamish was a forward noted for his courage and aggression, though lacking in technical skill.

Managerial career
After retiring as a player he became manager of Swindon Town. John Trollope had originally brought Beamish to the club as his assistant. After Trollope's unsuccessful venture into management came to an end, Beamish took over the reins from him towards the end of the 1982–83 season. Working on a tight budget, Beamish was given only one full season in charge, in which he led the Town to their lowest ever league finish – seventeenth in Fourth Division. However, he did lead the club to the Fourth Round of the FA Cup, where former club Blackburn Rovers eliminated Swindon. When his contract expired at the end of the 1983–84 season, new sponsors Lowndes Lambert demanded a big-name manager, and Beamish was replaced by Lou Macari.

He worked at Blackburn Rovers as commercial manager, from 1986 until his retirement in August 2012. He later worked with AFC Fylde.

Personal life
He married Lesley and in 1973 the couple were living with daughter Kirstie at Saltdean, Sussex. He later lived in Euxton and got involved with local charitable causes.

Career statistics

Managerial statistics

Honours
Brighton & Hove Albion
Football League Third Division second-place promotion: 1971–72

Blackburn Rovers
Football League Third Division: 1974–75

Individual
Port Vale F.C. Player of the Year: 1977–78

References

People from Bebington
English footballers
Association football forwards
Tranmere Rovers F.C. players
Brighton & Hove Albion F.C. players
Blackburn Rovers F.C. players
Port Vale F.C. players
Bury F.C. players
Swindon Town F.C. players
English Football League players
English football managers
Swindon Town F.C. managers
English Football League managers
Association football coaches
Swindon Town F.C. non-playing staff
Blackburn Rovers F.C. non-playing staff
AFC Fylde non-playing staff
1947 births
Living people